The 2012 PTT Pattaya Open was a women's professional tennis tournament played on outdoor hard courts. It was the 21st edition of the PTT Pattaya Open and was part of the International category on the 2012 WTA Tour. It took place at  the Dusit Thani Hotel in Pattaya, Thailand from February 5 through February 12, 2012. Daniela Hantuchová won the singles title.

Third-seeded  Daniela Hantuchová won her second consecutive singles title at the event and earned $37,000 first-prize money.

Finals

Singles

 Daniela Hantuchová defeated  Maria Kirilenko, 6–7(4–7), 6–3, 6–3
It was Hantuchová's 1st singles title of the year and 5th of her career.

Doubles

 Sania Mirza /  Anastasia Rodionova defeated  Chan Hao-ching /  Chan Yung-jan, 3–6, 6–1, [10–8]

Singles main-draw entrants

Seeds

1 Rankings as of January 30, 2012

Other entrants
The following players received wildcards into the main draw:
 Noppawan Lertcheewakarn 
 Nicha Lertpitaksinchai 
 Nungnadda Wannasuk 
The following players received entry from the qualifying draw:
 Chang Kai-Chen
 Hsieh Su-wei 

 Zhou Yimiao

Retirements
  Laura Robson (lower back injury)
  Galina Voskoboeva (illness)
  Vera Zvonareva (left hip injury)

Doubles main-draw entrants

Seeds

1 Rankings are as of January 30, 2012

Retirements
  Kai-Chen Chang (illness)
  Anne Keothavong (illness) 
  Tamarine Tanasugarn (severe illness)

References

External links
 Tournament draws

 
 WTA Tour
 in women's tennis
Tennis, WTA Tour, PTT Pattaya Open
Tennis, WTA Tour, PTT Pattaya Open

Tennis, WTA Tour, PTT Pattaya Open